Some of the folk sects, like Balarami, Baul, Sahedhani, Karta bhaja, Matuya, Jagomohani, and Nyadar are still found in different places of both Bengals.

Balarami 
Balarami Sect was established by Balaram Hari in Meherpur, Nadia district of Bengal Presidency (Now a day in Meherpur District of Bangladesh). This sect believes that life is pure and simple above greed and sensuality. In this sect, preachers, gurus and avatars are not present. The followers have no peculiar sect marks or uniform. The Muslim disciples call their deity Hari-Allah while the Hindu disciples use term the Hari rama.The Balaramis are still to be found at some places like Meherpur of Bangladesh and Nischintapur, Shabenagar, Palishipara, Natna, Hawlia, Arshinagor, goribpur in Nadia, Daikiari in Purulia, Shalunigram in Bankura of India, etc.

Baul 
The Baul is most well known folk sect in Bengal. The Baul a group of mixed elements of the Sahaja and Sufism. The Bauls have a tradition which constitutes both a syncretic religious sect and a musical tradition.

The Baul community has spread from throughout the Bengal region, comprising Bangladesh and the Indian states of West Bengal, Tripura, and Barak Valley of As. In 2005, the Baul tradition of Bangladesh was included in the list of Masterpieces of the Oral and Intangible Heritage of Humanity by UNESCO. Lalon Shah is regarded as the most celebrated Baul saint in history.

Sahebdhani 
The Sahebdhani sect does not believe in neither creed nor caste. This sect believes in praying together. The disciples belong to both Muslim and Hindu religious. The spiritual guides are called Dinadayal, Dinabandhu by the followers of this sect. The Sahebdhani originated at village of Brittihuda of district of Nadia. Kubir Sarkar and Jadubindu are two  famous and celebrated Sahebdhani saints.

Matuya 
The Matuya Sect originated in Bangladesh around 1860 AD by Harichand Thakur. The followers of this sect is mainly Namasudras, a Scheduled caste group in Bengal. They believe in Vaisnavite Hinduism and self-realization ("Swayam-Dikshiti"). Nowadays, a considerable number of Matuyas are to be found in West Bengal in India.

Other sects 
Other important folk sects in Bengal include:
Karta bhaja
Jagomohani
 Nyadar

See also
 Baul
Kartabhaja
Matua Mahasangha

References

Religion in Bangladesh
Religion in West Bengal
Bengali culture
Bengali folklore
Mysticism
Culture of West Bengal
Bangladeshi culture